The State Tower Building is a high-rise building located in Syracuse, New York. Completed in 1928, the building remains the highest in Syracuse. For several years after the Bastable Theatre burnt down in a 1923 fire, the plot of land was considered as the potential site of a new theatre or an office building. Eventually the plot's owners, Central Offices decided to build an office building. Designed by Thompson & Churchill, work began on the foundation of the State Tower Building in 1927. The tower was completed by late April 1928.

It initially functioned as an office building, and was listed on the National Register of Historic Places as a contributing property in the Hanover Square Historic District. In 2016 the building was bought by different owners, who redeveloped the top floors into high-end apartments; retaining just the first eight floors as office space.

Description
The State Tower Building is located on a plot where Genesee, Warren, and Water streets intersect. The whole block is occupied by the building, while a larger tower juts up on the Warren Street side. The building is made of steel and concrete with a limestone, terra-cotta and brick facade. The bricks on the facade gradually get lighter towards the top of the building; this was intended to make the building seem higher than it is. The facade was decorated as typical for an Art Deco building.

The building was designed as a large office building with the first 10 floors being large, and the top floors being setback and smaller such that one entity might occupy an entire floor. On the roof of the tenth floor was a deck on which there was a full-service restaurant.

When first constructed, the building had hollow chambers between the outer and inner walls for insulation. It had about  floor space, and was designed to provide maximum light. It was connected to a parking garage.

History

Block
The area where the State Tower Building was constructed was previously occupied by the Bastable block, which had been standing since at least 1852. The block was four stories tall and housed the Shakespeare Hall and arcade. It burnt down on November 20, 1891. Two years later, Frederick Bastable built the Bastable Theatre in its place. Sam S. Shubert managed the theatre to profitability in 1897, booking a variety of sensational shows and comedies. The Bastable block was virtually razed in a 1923 fire; the theatre itself was completely destroyed.

Construction
In the aftermath of the fire, Stephen Bastable, who owned the block, resolved to replace the Bastable Theatre with an office building. In July 1923 he announced that the block would be filled by a "modern office building". The plot was purchased by Central Offices, led by Albert Mayer and Charles Mayer, who resolved to build an office building on the site. They considered building a larger theatre with an office tower on top of it, and an informal agreement was reportedly reached for leasing of the theatre. However, the plan soon developed further and it became clear that both a theatre and office building could not be built on the site. Plans for a new theatre were dropped. The architect was Thompson & Churchill.

The foundation began to be dug in 1927. This was the deepest foundation ever sunk in Downtown Syracuse, below the level of Onondaga Lake, and pumps were necessary to remove water that was seeping in. 300 people were involved in digging, in two 150 person shifts. On June 10, the Syracuse Herald reported that the foundation was set to be completed by July 1. The tower was completed by April 29, 1928, and scheduled to be formally opened two days later. On the 29th, an article in the Syracuse Herald wrote that the tower marked the beginning of a "new era in progress of [the] city". Before opening, 80 percent of the building was leased to commercial tenants. Upon completion, the building was upstate New York's tallest building.

Later history
The building's exterior was lit at night from its opening to the 1960s. On May 29, 1962, a gas explosion hit the building, causing an estimated $100,000 in damages, and several injuries. The basement was flooded, the structure shook as fumes traveled through the building, and the explosion caused a minor panic, as about 3,000 people were inside at the time. The building is a contributing property in the Hanover Square Historic District, which was listed on the U.S. National Register of Historic Places in 1976.

It was renovated in 2003.

The State Tower Building was the site of regular peregrine falcon nesting, and the top floor holds a nesting box. In 2015, live cameras that offered views of the nesting box were installed. After 2019 renovations to the building, the box was moved and as of 2021 had not been used in "a couple of years", according to the local office of the Department of Environmental Conservation.

In 2014, some concerns were raised over possible hazards with the facade of the building. Two years later, a developer purchased the building for $5.4 million. As over half of the building was unoccupied, the developers kept only the first 7 floors of the building as office space and from 2016 to 2018 redeveloped the upper floors into 61 high-end apartments. In addition to redeveloping the apartments, all windows, the roof, and substantial portions of the facade were replaced. A second stairwell was added to the top floors.

The building is the site of "The Climb", a program that raises funds to aid children with cancer in Central New York. During the fundraiser, participants climb the 338 steps in the State Tower.

Reception
Evamaria Hardin describes the building as "seem[ing] to be Syracuse's counterpart to New York's Empire State Building". Upon its completion in 1928, the Syracuse Herald deemed the building "a massive yet graceful combination of colored brick, concrete, tile and hidden steel framework" and wrote that it was Syracuse's first "skyscraper".

The building is Syracuse's tallest, and has been since its completion.

See also
List of tallest buildings in the United States

References

Bibliography

External links

Skyscrapers in Syracuse, New York
Art Deco architecture in New York (state)
Historic district contributing properties in New York (state)
National Register of Historic Places in Syracuse, New York
Office buildings on the National Register of Historic Places in New York (state)
Skyscraper office buildings in New York (state)
Office buildings completed in 1928